Rebekka Sofiá Mathew (born 25 September 1986) is a former child star and was half of the Faroese-Danish pop duo, Creamy. The other half of the duo was Rannva Joensen. She is the sister of singers Simon Mathew and Sabina Mathew.

In 2007 she recorded the Danish version of "You Are the Music in Me" from High School Musical 2 with her brother Simon Mathew. The music video premiered on the Scandinavian Disney Channel on 24 August 2007. The single was released on 29 September 2007 and the special Scandinavian version of the High School Musical 2 soundtrack was released on 26 September 2007.

External links 
 

1986 births
Living people
People from Hirtshals
People from Norddjurs Municipality
21st-century Danish  women singers